One Hundred Horses (Chinese: 百駿圖) is a Qing dynasty silk and ink painting by Giuseppe Castiglione. It was painted in 1728 for the Yongzheng emperor. The painting depicts a hundred horses in a variety of poses and activities, combining Western realism with traditional Chinese composition and brushwork. Some of the horses are in a 'flying gallop' pose, which had not been done before by European painters.  The painting was executed using tempera on silk in the form of a Chinese handscroll. It was largely done in a European style in accordance with the rules of perspective, and with a consistent light source. However, the dramatic chiaroscuro shading typical of Baroque paintings is reduced and there are only traces of shadow under the hooves of the horses.

References 

1728 paintings
Yongzheng Emperor